The Spanish Wikipedia is a Spanish-language edition of Wikipedia, a free online encyclopedia. It has  articles. Started in May 2001, it reached 100,000 articles on March 8, 2006 and 1,000,000 articles on May 16, 2013. It is the -largest Wikipedia as measured by the number of articles and has the 4th-most edits. It also ranks 12th in terms of depth among Wikipedias.

History 
In February 2002, Larry Sanger wrote an e-mail to a mailing list stating that Bomis was considering selling advertisements on Wikipedia. Edgar Enyedy, a user on the Spanish Wikipedia, criticized the proposal. Jimmy Wales and Sanger responded by saying that they did not immediately plan to implement advertisements, but Enyedy began establishing a fork. Enciclopedia Libre was established by February 26, 2002. Enyedy persuaded most of the Spanish Wikipedians into going to the fork. By the end of 2002, over 10,000 articles were posted on the new site, and the Spanish Wikipedia was inactive for the rest of the year. Andrew Lih wrote that "for a long time it seemed that Spanish Wikipeda would be the unfortunate runt left from the Spanish fork." The general popularity of Wikipedia attracted new users to the Spanish Wikipedia who were unfamiliar with the fork and these users came by June 2003. By the end of that year the Spanish Wikipedia had over 10,000 articles. The size of the Spanish Wikipedia overtook that of the fork in the northern hemisphere in the fall of 2004.

Lih stated in 2009 that the concepts of advertising and forking were still sensitive issues for the Wikipedia community because "It took more than a year for the Spanish Wikipedia to get back on its feet again" after the fork had been initiated.

After the spin-off, the Spanish Wikipedia had very little activity until the upgrade to the Phase III of the software, later renamed MediaWiki, when the number of new users started to increase again. Both projects continue to co-exist, but the Spanish Wikipedia is by far the more active of the two.

Key dates 

 March 16, 2001: Jimmy Wales announced the internationalization of Wikipedia.
 May 11, 2001: The Spanish Wikipedia is established along with eight other wikis. Its first domain was spanish.wikipedia.com.
 May 21, 2001: The oldest known article, Anexo:Países (English translation: Countries of the world), is created.
 February 26, 2002: many contributors left to form the Enciclopedia Libre Universal en Español, rejecting perceived censorship and the possibility of advertising on the Bomis-supported Wikipedia.
 October 23, 2002: the domain spanish.wikipedia.com is changed to es.wikipedia.org.
 June 30, 2003: the mailing list for the Spanish Wikipedia is created (Wikies-l).
 October 6, 2003: first bot created on this Wikipedia. Its user name is SpeedyGonzalez.
 July 18, 2004: the Spanish edition switches to UTF-8, allowing any character to be used directly in forms.
 December 9, 2004: it is decided that Wikipedia in Spanish will use free images only.
 August 24, 2006: three checkusers are elected. They can examine IP addresses.
 December 11, 2006: following a vote, the Arbitration Committee, whose local name is Comité de Resolución de Conflictos (CRC) is created.
 June 11, 2007: last local image was erased, so all media are retrieved from Wikimedia Commons.
 September 1, 2007: first local chapter of Wikimedia Foundation is created in a Spanish-speaking country (Argentina).
 December 13, 2008: it was decided to eliminate the stub template from Spanish Wikipedia.
 March 25, 2009: the first oversighters are elected. They can delete edits so they cannot be seen even by regular administrators.
 April 15, 2009: the Arbitration Committee is dissolved after a vote.
 May 16, 2013: the Spanish Wikipedia became the seventh Wikipedia to cross the million article count.
 January 20, 2019: the Spanish Wikipedia reaches the count of 1,500,000 articles.

Size and users 
{{Bar box
|title=Active editors by Country
|titlebar=#Fcd116
|left1=Country
|right1=percent
|float=left
|bars=

|caption ={{center|October 2021Source: Wikimedia Statistics - Page Edits Per Wikipedia Language - Breakdown}}
}}

It has the second most users, after the English Wikipedia. However, it is ranked eighth for number of articles, below other Wikipedias devoted to languages with smaller numbers of speakers, such as German, French, Cebuano, Dutch  and Russian. In terms of quality, parameters such as article size (over 2 KB: 40%) show it as the second out of the ten largest Wikipedias after the German one. As of October 2012, Spanish Wikipedia is the fourth Wikipedia in terms of the number of edits, as well as the third Wikipedia by the number of page views.

By country of origin, by September 2017, Spain was the main contributor to the Spanish Wikipedia (39.2% of edits). It is followed by Argentina (10.7%), Chile (8.8%), the Netherlands (8.4%), Mexico (7.0%), Venezuela (5.1%), Peru (3.5%), the United States (3.1%), Colombia (2.7%), Uruguay (1.3%) and Germany (1.1%). Note that a number of bots are hosted in the Netherlands.

Among the countries where Spanish is either an official language or a de facto national language, Argentina, Chile, Mexico, Spain and Venezuela have established local chapters of the Wikimedia Foundation.

 Usage in Spain 
Following a 2007 study by Netsuus (online market analysis enterprises) on the use of Wikipedia in Spain, it was revealed that most users consult Spanish Wikipedia (97%) compared to Wikipedias in other regional languages (2.17% for Wikipedia in Catalan, 0.64% in Galician and 0.26% in Basque).

 Differences from other Wikipedias 
 The Spanish Wikipedia only accepts free images, and has rejected fair use since 2004, after a public vote. In 2006, it was decided to phase out the use of local image uploads and to exclusively use Wikimedia Commons for images and other media in the future.
 Unlike the French and English Wikipedias, the Spanish Wikipedia does not have an Arbitration Committee. A local version was created in January 2007 (comprising seven members, chosen by public vote), and dissolved in 2009 after another vote.
 Some templates, like the navigation templates, have been deprecated, being the only Wikipedia where it is forbidden to use these templates, instead relying on categories that perform the same function.
 Terminology in Spanish:
 The equivalent to the English Wikipedia's featured articles and good articles are artículos destacados and artículos buenos respectively.
 Following a vote in August 2004, administrators in the Spanish Wikipedia took the name of bibliotecarios (librarians). Other discarded options were usuarios especiales (special users) or basureros (janitors).

 Evaluation and criticism 
A comparative study by the Colegio Libre de Eméritos, made by Manuel Arias Maldonado (University of Malaga) and published in 2010, compared some articles with those of the English and German Wikipedias. It concluded that the Spanish version of Wikipedia was the least reliable of the three. It found it to be more cumbersome and imprecise than the German and English Wikipedias, stated that it often lacked reliable sources, including much unreferenced data, and found it to be too dependent on online references.

During Wikimania 2009, free-software activist Richard Stallman criticized the Spanish Wikipedia for restricting links to the Rebelion.org left-wing web site and allegedly banning users who had complained about what had happened. Participants in the Spanish Wikipedia responded that Rebelion.org is primarily a news aggregator, that links to aggregators should be replaced with links to original publishers whenever possible, and that they considered the issue to be one of spam.

According to a 2013 Oxford University study, five of the ten most disputed pages on the Spanish Wikipedia were football (soccer) clubs, including Club América, FC Barcelona, Athletic Bilbao, Alianza Lima, and Newell's Old Boys.

In 2022, several Spanish cultural and political figures published a manifesto alleging a "lack of neutrality and ... obvious political bias in [the Spanish] Wikipedia" and claimed that the Spanish Wikipedia is "edited by people who, hiding behind anonymous editor accounts, take the opportunity to carry out political activism, either by including data erroneous or false, or selecting news from the media with a clear political and ideological bias, which refer to controversial, distorted, insidious or inaccurate information".

The Spanish Wikipedia has been criticized for offering a whitewashed coverage of Cristina Kirchner.

In September 2022 a manifesto signed by Juan Carlos Girauta, Álvaro Vargas Llosa, Cayetana Álvarez de Toledo, Joaquín Leguina, Albert Rivera, Daniel Lacalle and Toni Cantó (figures associated with Spanish far right parties like Partido Popular, Ciudadanos and Vox, or far right media like Libertad Digital) among others was published denouncing political bias in the Spanish Wikipedia.

 References 

 Notes 
 Lih, Andrew. The Wikipedia Revolution: How a Bunch of Nobodies Created the World's Greatest Encyclopedia''. Hyperion, New York City. 2009. First Edition.  (alkaline paper).

External links 

 

Internet properties established in 2001
Wikipedia
Wikipedia
Wikipedias by language
Wikipedias in Romance languages